Moryella is a Gram-positive, non-spore-forming, strictly anaerobic and non-motile bacterial genus from the family of Lachnospiraceae with one known species (Moryella indoligenes). Moryella indoligenes has been isolated from clinical specimens.

References

External links
Type strain of Moryella indoligenes at BacDive -  the Bacterial Diversity Metadatabase
 

Lachnospiraceae
Monotypic bacteria genera
Bacteria genera